The 1971 All-Ireland Under-21 Hurling Championship was the eighth staging of Ireland's hurling knock-out competition for players aged between 18 and 21. Cork won the championship, beating Wexford 7-8 to 1-11 in the final.

The championship

Format

All-Ireland Championship
Semi-finals: (2 matches) The three provincial winners join Galway to make up the four semi-finalists.  The pairings are Munster v Ulster and Leinster v Galway.  Two teams are eliminated at this stage while two teams advance to the All-Ireland final.

Final: (1 match) The winners of the two semi-finals contest the All-Ireland final.

Results

Leinster Under-21 Hurling Championship

Second round

Semi-finals

Final

Munster Under-21 Hurling Championship

First round

Semi-finals

Final

All-Ireland Under-21 Hurling Championship

Semi-finals

Final

Championship statistics

Miscellaneous
 Cork's victory in the championship decider is the county's fourth All-Ireland title in succession and fifth in six years.  The 'four-in-a-row' is a record which still stands as of 2010. 
 Wexford become the first team to lose three All-Ireland finals in-a-row.

4 goals in a final and 4 goals and a point in semi-final at U21 by John (Rocky) Rothwell are high scoring records which still stand as of 2013.

Under
All-Ireland Under-21 Hurling Championship